Park Sol-mi (born Park Hye-jeong on January 3, 1978) is a South Korean actress.

Acting career 
Park had a minor role in the 1996 series Papa, then made her official debut in MBC's amateur talent contest in 1998. Her breakthrough came in 2002 when she starred in several television dramas, including Bad Girls and the popular Winter Sonata. In 2004 she made her film debut in Park Jung-woo's Dance with the Wind, which required her to learn ballroom dancing over a four-month period of intensive training. For her second film, Paradise Murdered, Park received a nomination for Best Supporting Actress at the 2007 Blue Dragon Film Awards.

In 2008, Park signed a contract with management company Heavenly Star Entertainment. After a three-year hiatus from television, she was announced as the lead in the MBC drama My Lady, a remake of the 1980s series Terminal. Park said that she found the character of Sera appealing because of the good and bad sides to her personality.

In October 2018, Park signed with new agency Fantagio.

Other pursuits 
In addition to being an actress, Park is also an amateur pianist. After attending a concert by Japanese pop group Jaja in 2005, she expressed a desire to perform with the band, and was later invited to play on their second album, I Love You. Park played piano on the album's title track, and also appeared in the promotional video. The album was released in February 2006 by Horipro under its MusicTaste imprint. She is also active in Japan with various promotions and commercials.

Personal life
Park began dating actor Han Jae-suk after they starred together in The Great Merchant in 2010. They wed at Aston House, Sheraton Grande Walkerhill Hotel in Seoul on April 21, 2013. In September 2013, Park's agency announced that the couple is expecting their first child. 
On March 23, 2014, she gave birth to their daughter.

Filmography

Television series

Film

Variety shows

Awards

References 

1978 births
Living people
South Korean film actresses
South Korean television actresses
People from Iksan
Sangmyung University alumni
Sungkyunkwan University alumni